Gòtics Rugby Club (Gòtics RC) is a rugby union from Barcelona established in 1984. They play their home matches at Camp Municipal de Rugbi La Foixarda.

Created as a result of the abolition of the RCD Espanyol's rugby section, four players from this section, Toni Rigat, Carles Tabernero, Josep Maria Vilajosana and Josep Cobo, formed a new rugby team, keeping the white and blue colours of the uniform.

Story 
The club was created in 1984, after the budget reduction made by  R.C.D Espanyol in which it was decided to eliminate some of its sections, including the rugby section.

There were many things to do; the first was to look for a name, a uniform and a mascot for the club. The uniform was the most simple; the white and blue. They wore a blue shirt, white shorts and blue socks, the same uniform the club wore previously. When it came to come up with a name, this was a complicated thing, as they were looking for an identification that was ancient and related to Barcelona.

After many proposals and ideas to name what would be the new club, a typical neighbourhood would give the solution: “Gòtics” (Gothics). The club was identified with the city and with the city and as being the oldest rugby playing club, as well as a reference to the Gothic Quarter of Barcelona.

The same thing happened with the mascot. For that, the mascot would be a mammoth, which was strong and ancient, like the same club. Then it was time to make some statutes, and in 1984, it was registered as a sports society.

The next step was to plan the season, split the chores, and get to work; it was all a series of meetings, papers, documents, and so on. Then came the first meeting with the rest of the people who were to be part of the Club.

In its first season on 1985, the club had 3 teams: junior, youth and senior. The start of the season was very tough, even though the youth team could qualify for the semifinals of the Catalan Rugby Cup of the season was very hard, in spite of this the youthful equipment could be classified for the semifinals of the Catalan Rugby Cup and with the great surprise to win it, achieving therefore the first important triumph of the club and its first cup.

In 1987 and 1988, the team went on to win the Catalan Rugby Championship, playing in the bye stage and getting promoted to the 1st National Division.

Two years after its creation, it was started a Rugby School for the kids who wanted to start to play rugby. Currently the Schoo has more than 150 players from 7 to 14 years and more than 25 instructors who train them to learn the values of rugby and at the same time, to have a good time.

Currently, Gòtics RC has 500 members – of which 350 are players – who also give economic and social support to the club. The financial support has also been obtained thanks to its sponsors.

Uniform 
Gòtics RC's uniform is a simple but very formal and traditional uniform due to the one worn by the previous team (Espanyol Rugby Club) . The uniform colours are blue and white.

Honours 
Gòtics RC won the Catalan Rugby Championship in the 1987–88 season, winning its first championship. The club was runner-up in 1989, 2003, 2004, 2008, 2013, 2014 and 2016.

References

External links 

 

Sports clubs in Barcelona
Rugby union teams in Catalonia
Sports clubs established in 1984
1984 establishments in Catalonia